Henu may refer to:
 HenU, Henan University, China
 Ancient Egyptian mythology: Henu (alt. Hennu) Boat
 Henu (alt. Hennu, Henenu, Hannu), ancient Egyptian official serving under Mentuhotep II
Hénu commune in northern France